Asceles is a genus of stick insects in the tribe Necrosciini. Some of the species of Asceles have a distribution in Malaysia and Singapore.

Species
Many of the species have numerous synonyms which will be listed  alongside their accepted name: see talk page for current list.
 Asceles adspirans (Redtenbacher 1908)
 Asceles annandalei (Günther 1938)
 Asceles bispinus (Redtenbacher 1908)
 Asceles brevicollis (Redtenbacher 1908)
 Asceles brevipennis (Redtenbacher 1908); also attributed to Hennemann, Conle & W. Zhang, 2008
 Asceles caesius (Chen, S.C. & Y.H. He 1999)
 Asceles certus (Redtenbacher 1908)
 Asceles civilis (Redtenbacher 1908)
 Asceles clavatus (Chen, S.C. & J. Wang 1998)
 Asceles cornucervi (Redtenbacher 1908)
 Asceles diadema (Redtenbacher 1908)
 Asceles dilatatus (Chen, S.C. & Y.H. He 2004)
 Asceles dorsalis (Redtenbacher 1908)
 Asceles elongatus (Redtenbacher 1908)
 Asceles gadarama (Westwood 1859); also known as Necroscia gadarama (Westwood, 1859) and Sosibia gadarama (Westwood, 1859)
 Asceles glaber (Günther 1938)
 Asceles gracillimus (Werner 1934); also known as Aaceles gracillimus
 Asceles heros (Redtenbacher 1908)
 Asceles icaris (Stål 1877); also known as Necroscia icaris (Stål, 1877)
 Asceles larunda (Westwood 1859);   also known as Asceles inquinatus (Redtenbacher,  1908)   and Necroscia larunda (Westwood,  1859)
 Asceles lineatus (Redtenbacher 1908)
 Asceles longicauda (Bi 1990); also known as Sinophasma longicauda
 Asceles longipes (Redtenbacher 1908)
 Asceles longzhouensis (Chen, S.C. & Y.H. He 2000)
 Asceles malaccae (Saussure 1868);  also known as Necroscia malaccae (Saussure,  1868)
 Asceles mancinus (Westwood 1859);  also known as Necroscia mancinus (Westwood,  1859)  and Sosibia mancinus (Westwood,  1859)
 Asceles margaritatus (Redtenbacher 1908)
 Asceles mecheli (Redtenbacher 1908)
 Asceles nigrogranosus (Stål 1877);  also known as Asceles nigrogranosa (Stål,  1877)  and Necroscia nigrogranosa (Stål,  1877)
 Asceles obsoletus (Redtenbacher 1908);  also attributed to Otte & Brock,  2005
 Asceles opacus (Redtenbacher 1908)
 Asceles panteli (Redtenbacher 1908)
 Asceles penicillatus (Redtenbacher 1908)
 Asceles perplexus (Redtenbacher 1908)
 Asceles pumila (Werner 1934); also known as Aaceles pumila
 Asceles quadriguttatus (Chen, S.C. & Y.H. He 1996); also known as Pachyscia quadriguttata (Chen & He, 1996)
 Asceles rufescens (Redtenbacher 1908); also known as Sipyloidea rufescens (Redtenbacher, 1908)
 Asceles rulanda, of which there are three subspecies: Asceles  rulanda modestior (Redtenbacher, 1908), Asceles  rulanda rulanda (Redtenbacher, 1908) and Asceles  rulanda undulatipes (Redtenbacher, 1908). Asceles rulanda undulatipes has also been written as Aaceles  undulatipes with the presumed synonym Asceles undulatipes
 Asceles rusticus (Redtenbacher 1908)
 Asceles scabra (Stål 1877); also known as Asceles scaber (Redtenbacher, 1908), Necroscia scabra (Stål, 877), Sipyloidea scabra (Stål, 1877) and Sosibia scabra (Stål, 1877)
 Asceles tanarata, of which are three subspecies: Asceles  tanarata amplior (Brock, 1999), Asceles  tanarata singapura (Seow-Choen & Brock, 1999) and Asceles  tanarata tanarata (Brock, 1999)
 Asceles validus (Redtenbacher 1908) 
 Asceles villosus (Redtenbacher 1908)

References

External links
 Images at iNaturalist

Phasmatodea genera
Phasmatodea of Asia
Lonchodidae